KJON (850 kHz) is an AM radio station licensed to Carrollton, Texas, and serving the Dallas-Fort Worth Metroplex.  It is owned and operated by Chatham Hill Foundation, which runs the religious Guadalupe Radio Network.  KJON carries a Spanish-language Catholic talk and teaching radio format.  It is sister stations with KATH 910 AM, which broadcasts a similar format in English.

By day, KJON is powered at 5,000 watts.  850 AM is a clear channel frequency reserved for Class A KOA Denver.  For that reason, KJON is a daytimer station and must leave the air at night to avoid interference.  The transmitter is off Dallas Parkway in Celina, Texas.

History
The station was KRPT until 1997 in Anadarko, Oklahoma, when it became KJON. The station moved to the Dallas area on June 10, 2003. Station signed on with a Tropical music format on May 3, 2004.

In November, 2006 the station license was transferred from BMP Fort Worth to Chatham Hill Foundation. details

External links
 DFW Radio/TV History

JON
Catholic radio stations
JON
JON
Radio stations established in 1997
JON